Susan Denberg (born Dietlinde Zechner; 2 August 1944) is a German-Austrian model and actress. Denberg has appeared on stage and in film, notably in Frankenstein Created Woman (1967) and other roles in the 1960s.

Personal life
Denberg was born in Bad Polzin, Germany and raised in Klagenfurt, Austria. 

Denberg married Anthony Scotti in Las Vegas (1965–1968). She had a son Wolfgang-Dieter in 1971; the father is of Yugoslavian descent and a second child. Now as Dietlinde Scotti, she resides in the tenth district of Vienna, Austria.

Career
Zechner adopted Susan Denberg as a stage name. She became a chorus dancer and 1966 Playboy playmate (Miss August). In addition, she did stage and dancing in London and Las Vegas.

In 1966, she appeared in the Star Trek episode, "Mudd's Women" (1966). Denberg's best known acting role was in the Hammer horror film, Frankenstein Created Woman (1967), opposite Peter Cushing. However, Denberg's voice in the film was dubbed, as her Austrian accent was considered too strong. 

After Frankenstein Created Woman, Denberg left Hollywood and returned to Austria. Thereafter, for many years sources incorrectly reported that she had died in the late 1960s, either accidentally or through suicide. In an interview published in the July 22, 1968 edition of 'Midnight' magazine titled "LSD Wrecked My Life", Denberg admitted that since returning to Austria she had fallen into a life of alcohol and drugs, including LSD. After the birth of her son in 1971 Denberg worked as a topless waitress at an adult cinema in Vienna and later as a dancer at a Vienna nightclub called Renz. She also worked in Geneva, Switzerland. After the birth of her second child in 1976, she retired from nude dancing.

Film/TV work
 Star Trek: The Original Series (episode: "Mudd's Women", 1966) as Magda Kovacs
 An American Dream (1966) as Ruta
 Twelve O'Clock High (episode: "Back to the Drawing Board", 1966) as a German girl
 Frankenstein Created Woman (1967) as Christina

References

External links
 

1944 births
Living people
German female models
German film actresses
German television actresses
People from Połczyn-Zdrój
People from the Province of Pomerania